Sjøsanden is a beach in the town of Mandal in the municipality of Lindesnes in Agder county, Norway. The beach sits in the Furulunden nature park, along the Mannefjorden, just south of the mouth of the Mandalselva river.

Media gallery

References

Beaches of Norway
Landforms of Agder
Lindesnes
North Sea